Julia Carlsson  (born 8 April 1975) is a Swedish former football forward. She played for the Sweden women's national football team and competed at the 1996 Summer Olympics. At the club level, she played for Älvsjö AIK.

See also
 Sweden at the 1996 Summer Olympics

References

External links
 
 

1975 births
Living people
Swedish women's footballers
Place of birth missing (living people)
Footballers at the 1996 Summer Olympics
Olympic footballers of Sweden
Women's association football forwards
Sweden women's international footballers